Shamkir  Olympic Sport Complex Stadium is a multi-use stadium in Shamkir, Azerbaijan.Stadium was opened in 2009. It is currently used mostly for football matches. It serves as a home ground of Shamkir FC of the Azerbaijan First Division. The stadium holds 2,000 spectators.

Shamkir District
Sports venues in Azerbaijan